A force-sensing capacitor is a material whose capacitance changes when a force, pressure or mechanical stress is applied. They are also known as "force-sensitive capacitors". They can provide improved sensitivity and repeatability compared to force-sensitive resistors but traditionally required more complicated electronics.

Operation principle 
Typical force sensitive capacitors are examples of parallel plate capacitors.  For small deflections, there is a linear relationship between applied force and change in capacitance, which can be shown as follows:

Combining these equations gives the capacitance after an applied force as:

, where  is the separation between parallel plates when no force is applied.

This can be rearranged to:

Assuming that , which is true for small deformations where , we can simplify this to:

C 

It follows that:

C 
C  where , which is constant for a given sensor.

We can express the change in capacitance  as:

Production 
SingleTact makes force-sensitive capacitors using moulded silicon between two layers of polyimide to construct a 0.35mm thick sensor, with force ranges from 1N to 450N. The 8mm SingleTact has a nominal capacitance of 75pF, which increases by 2.2pF when the rated force is applied.  It can be mounted on many surfaces for direct force measurement.

Uses 
Force-sensing capacitors can be used to create low-profile force-sensitive buttons. They have been used in medical imaging to map pressures in the esophagus and to image breast and prostate cancer.

References 

Capacitors
Sensors